Choi Dong-soo (born January 29, 1985) is a South Korean footballer who last played as a forward for PSMS Medan (ISL).

References

External links 
 Profile at Liga Indonesia Official Site
 Profile at S-League Site

1985 births
Living people
South Korean footballers
South Korean expatriate footballers
Persisam Putra Samarinda players
PSMS Medan players
Persipura Jayapura players
Singapore Premier League players
Liga 1 (Indonesia) players
Expatriate footballers in Singapore
South Korean expatriate sportspeople in Singapore
Expatriate footballers in Indonesia
South Korean expatriate sportspeople in Indonesia
Association football forwards